The Haswell Islands are a group of rocky coastal islands lying off Mabus Point, Antarctica, and extending about  seaward. They were charted by the Australasian Antarctic Expedition under Douglas Mawson (1911–14), who applied the name "Rookery Islands" because of a large emperor penguin rookery on Haswell Island, the largest and seaward island in the group. In 1955 the Antarctic Names Committee of Australia proposed that the name Haswell be extended to the entire group.

List of islands
 Tokarev Island
 Vkhodnoy Island

See also 
 Composite Antarctic Gazetteer
 Holme Bay
 List of Antarctic islands south of 60° S
 Scientific Committee on Antarctic Research
 Territorial claims in Antarctica

References

Islands of Queen Mary Land
Archipelagoes of Antarctica